Enterocloster lavalensis, formerly Clostridium lavalense is an anaerobic, motile, spore-forming, rod-shaped, gram-positive bacterium first isolated from human feces.
The epithet "lavalense" refers to the institution, Université Laval, Québec, Canada.

References

External links

Type strain of Clostridium lavalense at BacDive -  the Bacterial Diversity Metadatabase

Bacteria described in 2009
Lachnospiraceae